Prodoxus tehuacanensis is a moth of the family Prodoxidae. It is found in Mexico in the Tehuacán-Cuicatlán region of Puebla and Oaxaca.

The wingspan is 8.3-11.25 mm for males and 9.2-11.6 mm for females. The forewings are white with dark bands in males. The hindwings are white with a grey area along the front edge. Adults are on wing in late April.

The larvae feed on Yucca periculosa and Yucca mixtecana. They feed superficially inside the stalk, and can diapause for at least three years before pupation and emergence.

Etymology
The species name refers to the Tehuacán-Cuicatlán region where all known collection sites are located.

References

Moths described in 2005
Prodoxidae